Dendronephthya klunzingeri is a species of soft coral in the family Nephtheidae.

This species is divaricate with discontinuous contours. Each bundle has 10 to 12 polyps. The branching lobes have sizable bunches.

References

Animals described in 1888
Nephtheidae